The Sentimental Bloke is a 1918 Australian silent film based on the 1915 verse novel The Songs of a Sentimental Bloke by C. J. Dennis. Produced and directed by Raymond Longford, the film stars Arthur Tauchert, Gilbert Emery, and Lottie Lyell, who also co-wrote the film with Longford.

A major critical and commercial success upon its release in Australia, the film was also popular in New Zealand and Great Britain, and is generally considered the greatest Australian silent film, and one of the best Australian movies of all time. The film inspired a sequel, Ginger Mick (1920), and a 1932 remake. In 2004, the National Film and Sound Archive released a fully restored version of The Sentimental Bloke, making it one of the few Australian silent films to survive intact.

Plot
Bill is a Woolloomooloo larrikin, who vows to abandon his life of gambling (playing Two-up) and drinking after a spell in gaol following a raid on a two up game. He falls in love with Doreen (Lyell), who works in a pickle factory, but faces competition from a more sophisticated rival, Stror 'at Coot.

Bill and Doreen argue, but are eventually reunited and get married. Bill gives up drinking and hanging out with his mate, Ginger Mick, and becomes a family man. He gets an offer from his uncle to manage an orchard in the country, and he and Doreen settle down there with their baby.

Cast
Arthur Tauchert as Bill, the Bloke
Lottie Lyell as Doreen
Gilbert Emery as Ginger Mick
Stanley Robinson as the Bloke's friend
Harry Young as the Stror 'at Coot
Margaret Reid as Doreen's mother
Charles Keegan as the parson
William Coulter as Uncle Jim
Helen Fergus as nurse
C. J. Dennis as himself

Production

C. J. Dennis' original book had been a best seller since its publication in 1915. It was read by executive J. D. Williams who gave Raymond Longford a copy and suggested it might make a good movie. Longford gave it to his partner Lottie Lyell and she was supportive.

Finance was provided by an Adelaide company, the Southern Cross Feature Film Company who had funded The Woman Suffers. C. J. Dennis was reluctant to give away the movie rights for fear it would affect book sales, however he eventually agreed after prolonged negotiations and a royalty payment of £1,000, half the film's budget.

Lyell is thought to have co-authored the screenplay which relocated the story from Melbourne to Woolloomooloo in Sydney.

Arthur Tauchert had extensive experience working in suburban vaudeville but had only made two short movies prior to this.

The movie was shot in 1918 on location in Woolloomooloo, with the orchard scenes done at Hornsby Valley near Sydney, and interiors at open-air sets at Wonderland City, Bondi (which meant Longford could avoid paying excessive rental for using sets at the Rushcutters Bay Studio). Some shots of sunsets and sunrises for the inter titles were done in Adelaide.

Sydney authorities refused to allow police uniforms to be depicted, or for shooting to take place in the city's gaols. However Longford managed to persuade Commonwealth dockside officials to appear as policemen and let him use an old watch house in Woolloomooloo.

Reception
The movie was first screened privately at Adelaide Wondergraph on 26 November 1918.

It took a while for the film to be released as Australasian Films refused to screen the movie in the Union Theatre chain. However it was seen by E. J. Carroll who decided to distribute it in Australia and overseas.

The Sentimental Bloke uses intertitles taken from the original poem written in Australian slang and was a hit when it opened in Melbourne Town Hall on 4 October 1919, breaking all existing box office records. It was also popular in Britain and New Zealand, but did not succeed in the U.S., where test audiences failed to understand the language. Despite being recut with Americanised intertitles, having some scenes cut out, and being renamed for the American market as The Story of a Tough Guy, it was withdrawn from distribution.

Variety called it "the best Australian made feature to date."

The initial success of The Sentimental Bloke prompted a sequel in 1920, Ginger Mick, and a remake in 1932 using the latest sound recording equipment from the United States. The sequel was a hit but the remake, although directed by the prolific actor and partner of Hoyts, F. W. Thring, did not fare as well as the original.

E. J. Carroll also sponsored a stage version of the book in 1922 produced by Bert Bailey and starring Walter Cornoch as the Bloke and Tal Ordell as Ginger Mick.

In 1931 Raymond Longford claimed that the film had been made for £900 and grossed £50,000 around the world.

Rediscovery

A 1952 fire in a Melbourne film library destroyed all but two boxes of film archives. The boxes revealed a complete 35mm nitrate positive of The Sentimental Bloke, which the following year were sent to a Sydney laboratory for duplication on to new 16mm acetate stock. The original nitrate copies were believed to have been destroyed in the 1960s. The new print was screened at the 1955 Sydney Film Festival to great acclaim, although Longford was not invited, as the organisers did not realise he was still alive.

The film also screened at the 1987 Cannes Film Festival.

An original 35mm negative of the film was discovered in 1973 at the Film Archive at George Eastman House International Museum of Photography and Film in Rochester, New York. The canisters had been mislabelled as The Sentimental Blonde but were discovered by luck. The film was the U.S. version which had some scenes deleted and included intertitles for the American audience. It was however, a better quality print than any of the Australian copies, and provided a base for a complete restoration.

The National Film and Sound Archive commenced on a full restoration project for the film in 2000 using the various pieces of archive material available. The project included colour tinting as close as possible to the original. This 'new' version premiered at the 2004 Sydney Film Festival and has played at the 2005 London Film Festival. It has since been released as a two DVD set which includes a booklet describing the film's history.

See also
 Cinema of Australia
 List of films based on poems
 Albert Arlen – composer of The Sentimental Bloke musical

References

External links

Raymond Longford & Lottie Lyell by William M. Drew
The Sentimental Bloke at the National Film and Sound Archive
The Sentimental Bloke at National Library of Australia
Ina Bertrand, Raymond Longford's The Sentimental Bloke: The Restored Version, Screening the Past.
The Sentimental Bloke at AustLit

1910s Australian films
The Songs of a Sentimental Bloke
Australian drama films
Australian silent feature films
Films based on Australian novels
Australian black-and-white films
Films based on poems
Films directed by Raymond Longford
Articles containing video clips
1918 drama films
Silent drama films